The meridian 2° east of Greenwich is a line of longitude that extends from the North Pole across the Arctic Ocean, the Atlantic Ocean, Europe, Africa, the Southern Ocean, and Antarctica to the South Pole.

The 2nd meridian east forms a great circle with the 178th meridian west.

From Pole to Pole
Starting at the North Pole and heading south to the South Pole, the 2nd meridian east passes through:

{| class="wikitable plainrowheaders"
! scope="col" width="125" | Co-ordinates
! scope="col" | Country, territory or sea
! scope="col" | Notes
|-
| style="background:#b0e0e6;" | 
! scope="row" style="background:#b0e0e6;" | Arctic Ocean
| style="background:#b0e0e6;" |
|-
| style="background:#b0e0e6;" | 
! scope="row" style="background:#b0e0e6;" | Atlantic Ocean
| style="background:#b0e0e6;" |
|-valign="top"
| style="background:#b0e0e6;" | 
! scope="row" style="background:#b0e0e6;" | North Sea
| style="background:#b0e0e6;" | Passing just east of Lowestoft, England, 
|-
| 
! scope="row" | 
| Passing just west of Paris
|-
| 
! scope="row" | 
| Llívia exclave - for about 1km
|-
| 
! scope="row" | 
| For about 9km
|-
| 
! scope="row" | 
| Passing just west of Barcelona
|-
| style="background:#b0e0e6;" | 
! scope="row" style="background:#b0e0e6;" | Mediterranean Sea
| style="background:#b0e0e6;" |
|-
| 
! scope="row" | 
|
|-
| 
! scope="row" | 
|
|-
| 
! scope="row" | 
| Passing just west of Niamey
|-
| 
! scope="row" | 
|
|-
| 
! scope="row" | 
|
|-
| style="background:#b0e0e6;" | 
! scope="row" style="background:#b0e0e6;" | Atlantic Ocean
| style="background:#b0e0e6;" |
|-
| style="background:#b0e0e6;" | 
! scope="row" style="background:#b0e0e6;" | Southern Ocean
| style="background:#b0e0e6;" |
|-
| 
! scope="row" | Antarctica
| Queen Maud Land, claimed by 
|-
|}

e002nd meridian east